Samuel Giamil (1847–1917) was an Assyrian scholar, polyglot and a Chaldean Catholic monk. He joined the Monastery of Rabban Hormizd in 1866. In 1869, he accompanied his Abbot and Patriarch Mar Yawsep VI Audo to the first Vatican Council. He was appointed a vicar for the diocese of ʿAqra for one year. He was elected a general Abbot for the Chaldean monks in 1881, 1887 and 1900.

He authored numerous scholarly works in Arabic, Latin, and Italian, and translated a theological book written originally in Syriac by Adam ʿAqraya from Latin back into Syriac.

Biography
Samuel Giamil was born in Tel Keppe in Ninveh Governorate in Iraq to Shimʿun Jamīl and Farīdeh. Tel Keppe was a predominantly Assyrian Christian town until the Islamic State occupation on 6 August 2014. In 1866 he joined the Monastery of Rabban Hormizd of the Chaldean Catholic Church. The then Abbot of the monastery was Elishaʿ Tīshā. In 1869, he accompanied Patriarch Mar Yawsep VI Audo to the First Vatican Council. There he attended college and continued his studies there until 1879, when he was ordained a priest. As soon as he returned, he was sent out to serve in the Monastery of Saint Mary near Alqosh. There he established a school in 1880. In 1885 he was sent to the northern regions of Mesopotamia by Patriarch Eliya ʿAbū al-Yūnān as a Patriarchal envoy. For an year, he served as the Vicar of the Chaldean Diocese of ʿAqra. In 1892, he accompanied Toma Audo (died 1918), the Archbishop of the Urmia, to the mountain villages for the purpose of healing a schism in the church.

Selected publications
 Monte Singar: Storia d’un popolo ignoto (1900)
 Symbolum Nestorianum anni p. Ch. n. 612 (1901)
 Genuinae relationes inter Sedem Apostolicam et Assyriorum Orientalium et Chaldaeorum Ecclesiam (1902).

References

1847 births
1917 deaths
People of Iraqi-Assyrian descent
Chaldean Catholics
Assyrian Iraqi writers
Syriacists
Syriac writers